The eighth Annual Pop Corn Music Awards were held in 1998 in Athens, Greece. The awards recognized the most popular artists and albums in Greece from the year 1998 as voted by Greek music publication Pop Corn. The awards were hosted by Andreas Mikroutsikos in the March 1999. The Pop Corn Music Awards were discontinued in 2002.

Performances

Winners and nominees

References 

1998
1998 music awards